Skybalonyx is an extinct genus of drepanosaur from the Chinle Formation in the Late Triassic. The type and only known species is Skybalonyx skapter, meaning "digging dung claw" from Ancient Greek. Skybalonyx is only known from numerous specimens of the enlarged claw on its second finger, characteristic of other derived drepanosaurids. However, Skybalonyx is unique compared to other drepanosaurs because its enlarged claw is wider than it is tall, and it is not as deep compared to those of the contemporary Drepanosaurus or Ancistronychus. Functional analyses of its claws compared to other drepanosaurs and various living animals indicates that Skybalonyx (as well as Ancistronychus) used its large claw for digging underground, perhaps even for burrowing. This contrasts with the inferred lifestyle of other drepanosaurids (including Drepanosaurus), which were arboreal. 

Reports published in October 2020 indicate its remains were discovered by graduate students in 2018 and 2019 at the Petrified Forest National Park in Arizona.

References

Drepanosaurs
Late Triassic reptiles of North America
Fossil taxa described in 2020
Prehistoric reptile genera